Snellenburg's Clothing Factory is a historic factory complex located in the Spring Garden neighborhood of Philadelphia, Pennsylvania.  It was built by the N. Snellenburg & Company and consists of two parts: a large, ornate building built in 1903, and a long, narrow building built in 1905.  They are connected by a bridge at the fourth, fifth, and sixth floors.  The front building is seven stories, constructed of limestone and brick with terra cotta ornament, and features a central tower.

It was added to the National Register of Historic Places in 1986.

References

Industrial buildings and structures on the National Register of Historic Places in Philadelphia
Industrial buildings completed in 1905
Spring Garden, Philadelphia
Textile mills in the United States
1905 establishments in Pennsylvania